The Kenner Stakes was an American Thoroughbred horse race run from 1870 through 1942 at Saratoga Race Course in Saratoga Springs, New York. Open to three-year-old horses, it was last contested at a distance of a mile and three sixteenths on dirt. It was run as the Miller Stakes  from 1920 through 1930 in honor of prominent horseman and co-founder of Life magazine, Andrew Miller.

Winners
(partial list)

1942 - Buckskin 
1941 - War Relic 
1940 - Your Chance
1939 - Hash
1938 - Bull Lea
1937 - Rex Flag
1936 - Granville
1935 - St. Bernard
1934 - Discovery
1933 - War Glory
1932 - Dark Secret
1931 - Mate
1930 - Whichone
1929 - Marine
1928 - Reigh Count
1927 - Brown Bud
1926 - Rock Star
1925 - Stirrup Cup
1924 - Klondyke
1923 - Martingale
1922 - Sweep By
1921 - Prudery
1920 - Man o' War
1919 - Milkmaid
1918 - Enfilade
1917 - Omar Khayyam
1903 - Injunction
1902 - Cunard
1901 - Baron Pepper
1893 - Stowaway
1892 - Ronald
1891 - Vallera
1890 - English Lady
1889 - Long Dance
1888 - Los Angeles
1887 - Swarthmore
1886 - Elkwood
1885 - Irish Pat
1884 - Powhattan
1883 - George Kinney
1882 - Boatman
1881 - Hindoo
1880 - Luke Blackburn
1879 - Falsetto
1878 - Duke of Magenta
1877 - Bazil
1876 - Charley Howard
1875 - Ozark
1874 - Stampede
1873 - The Ill-Used
1872 - Joe Daniels
1871 - Harry Bassett
1870 - Enquirer

References
 The Kenner Stakes at Saratoga Race Course at Pedigree Query
 August 8, 1920 New York Times article on Man o' War's win in the Miller Stakes

Discontinued horse races in New York (state)
Flat horse races for three-year-olds
Saratoga Race Course
Recurring sporting events established in 1870
Recurring sporting events disestablished in 1942
1870 establishments in New York (state)
1942 disestablishments in New York (state)